Sion Hill is a settlement on the island of Saint Croix, in the United States Virgin Islands.

History
The Sion Hill estate, a former sugarcane plantation, was the economic center of the area. The stone Danish colonial era plantation house, windmill base, and sugar processing factory buildings are now in ruins.

The windmill was used to power a sugar mill for crushing the sugar cane harvested on the plantation.

Sion Hill estate

The sugar plantation and rum distillery was established in the 18th century. The estate passed through several owners while it was in operation. The great house, the main residence on the plantation, is a one-story Classical Revival limestone building completed in 1765. The factory and grinding mill, the two primary buildings used for sugar production, were also made of limestone; the distillery is located within the factory building. The property also includes a cookhouse and a stable.

The plantation was added to the National Register of Historic Places on July 19, 1976.

See also
Sugar production in the Danish West Indies
Sugar plantations in the Caribbean

References

External links

Historic American Buildings Survey documentation, filed under Sion Hill, St. Croix, VI:

Houses in the United States Virgin Islands
Sugar plantations in Saint Croix, U.S. Virgin Islands
Plantations in the Danish West Indies
Populated places in Saint Croix, U.S. Virgin Islands
Houses completed in 1765
Houses on the National Register of Historic Places in the United States Virgin Islands
Buildings and structures on the National Register of Historic Places in the United States Virgin Islands
1765 establishments in North America
1760s establishments in the Caribbean
1760s establishments in Denmark
18th century in the Danish West Indies
Neoclassical architecture in the United States
Historic American Buildings Survey in the United States Virgin Islands